The men's 400 metres hurdles event at the 2009 European Athletics U23 Championships was held in Kaunas, Lithuania, at S. Dariaus ir S. Girėno stadionas (Darius and Girėnas Stadium) on 16, 17, and 18 July.

Medalists

Results

Final
18 July

Semifinals
17 July
Qualified: first 3 each heat and 2 fastest to Final

Semifinal 1

Semifinal 2

Heats
16 July
Qualified: first 3 each heat and 4 best to Semifinals

Heat 1

Heat 2

Heat 3

Heat 4

Participation
According to an unofficial count, 32 athletes from 21 countries participated in the event.

 (1)
 (1)
 (1)
 (1)
 (3)
 (3)
 (1)
 (1)
 (2)
 (1)
 (1)
 (1)
 (1)
 (3)
 (1)
 (1)
 (1)
 (3)
 (2)
 (1)
 (2)

References

400 metres hurdles
400 metres hurdles at the European Athletics U23 Championships